Salvador Capín Martino (born March 14, 1975 in Gijón), known as Salvador Capín, is a retired Spanish professional football player.

He spent a large amount of his professional career in Scotland, playing for Airdrieonians, Raith Rovers (twice) and Livingston. His only goal in Scottish football came when playing for Airdrieonians in a 5-1 win over Morton.

Honours
Airdrieonians
Scottish Challenge Cup: 2000–01

References

External links
Career summary by playerhistory.com

1975 births
Living people
Footballers from Gijón
Spanish footballers
La Liga players
Sporting de Gijón players
Polideportivo Ejido footballers
SD Huesca footballers
Universidad de Las Palmas CF footballers
Motril CF players
Spanish expatriate footballers
Expatriate footballers in Scotland
Spanish expatriate sportspeople in Scotland
Scottish Premier League players
Airdrieonians F.C. (1878) players
Raith Rovers F.C. players
Livingston F.C. players
Scottish Football League players
Association football midfielders
UC Ceares players